Ulf Weinstock (born August 10, 1952 in Strängnäs, Sweden) is an ice hockey player who played for the Swedish national team. He won a bronze medal at the 1980 Winter Olympics. He played for Leksands from 1970 until 1984 and for Stjernen in Norway from 1984 to 1987.

References

1952 births
Living people
Ice hockey players at the 1980 Winter Olympics
Leksands IF players
Olympic bronze medalists for Sweden
Olympic ice hockey players of Sweden
Olympic medalists in ice hockey
Stjernen Hockey players
Swedish ice hockey players
Medalists at the 1980 Winter Olympics
People from Strängnäs Municipality
Sportspeople from Södermanland County